Happy Birthday Mummyji is a 2021 Indian Hindi-language drama short film written and directed by Shefali Shah, who stars as the single character in the film, and produced by Sunshine Pictures.

Plot 
The story of a woman who is recognised by her relationships with other people, preparing a birthday party.

Production
In 2020, Shah decided to experiment with writing and directing in two self-starring COVID-19-based short films, Someday and Happy Birthday Mummyji. In Someday, which marked her directorial debut, she played a frontline healthcare worker who returns home for a seven-day quarantine due to the pandemic and spends time interacting through a door with her elderly mother, who suffers from Alzheimer’s disease. Shah wrote the script of Happy Birthday Mummy Ji drawing upon her own life experiences and believed her central character in it "represents all the women you know".

Themes
A single-character film,  the film addresses themes of loneliness, female desire. Shah said about the film: "I believe it is a story from my life, my friends, my mom’s. It is perhaps the need to tell that we have reached a point of desperation and would just like to let go."

Release

The film was released on 23 July 2021 by Royal Stag Barrel Select Large Short Films.

Reception

Critical response
The film opened to positive reviews and attracted some notice for a masturbation scene played by Shah.

References

External links 

Happy Birthday Mummyji on YouTube

Films about women in India
Indian feminist films
2021 short films
2020s Hindi-language films
2021 drama films
2020s feminist films
Indian short films
Indian direct-to-video films
2021 direct-to-video films
2021 films
Direct-to-video drama films